Events in the year 1998 in Bulgaria.

Incumbents 

 President: Petar Stoyanov
 Prime Minister: Ivan Kostov

Events 

 

 18 – 25 April – The 16th European Badminton Championships were held in Sofia, Bulgaria and were hosted by the European Badminton Union and the Bulgarian Badminton Federation.

Deaths
August 5 - Todor Zhivkov, head of state (1954-1989)

References 

 
1990s in Bulgaria
Years of the 20th century in Bulgaria
Bulgaria
Bulgaria